

This is a list of the properties on the National Register of Historic Places in Broome County, New York, taken from the National Register of Historic Places for Broome County.

This is intended to be a complete list of properties and districts listed on the National Register of Historic Places in Broome County, New York.  The locations of National Register properties and districts for which the latitude and longitude coordinates are included below, may be seen in a map.



Current listings

|}

Former listings

|}

See also

National Register of Historic Places listings in New York

References

External links
National Register of Historic Places.com:  Broome County listings — private website with street addresses and other useful info.

.
Broome County